Clausilia is a European genus of small, air-breathing land snails, terrestrial pulmonate gastropod mollusks in the family Clausiliidae, the door snails, all of which have a clausilium.

Snails in this genus have left-handed coiling in their shells, which are very elongate in shape.

Species
Species within the genus Clausilia include:
  †Clausilia baudoni Michaud, 1862 
 Clausilia bidentata (Strøm, 1765)
 Clausilia brembina Strobel, 1850
 † Clausilia ceresolensis H. Nordsieck, 2013 
 Clausilia corynodes Held, 1836
 Clausilia cruciata (Studer, 1820)
 † Clausilia dehmi (H. Nordsieck, 2007) 
 Clausilia dubia Draparnaud, 1805
 Clausilia gracilis C. Pfeiffer, 1821
 Clausilia plicatula Draparaud
 † Clausilia portisii Sacco, 1886 
 † Clausilia produbia H. Nordsieck, 1976 
 † Clausilia prostrobeli (H. Nordsieck, 2013) 
 Clausilia pumila Pfeiffer, 1828
 † Clausilia rolfbrandti (Schlickum, 1969) 
 Clausilia rugicollis Rossmässler, 1836
 Clausilia rugosa (Draparnaud, 1801)
 † Clausilia stranzendorfensis H. Nordsieck, 1990 
 † Clausilia strauchiana H. Nordsieck, 1972 
 Clausilia strobeli Strobel, 1850
 Clausilia ventricova
 Clausilia whateliana Charpentier, 1850
Synonyms
 Clausilia (Alinda) H. Adams & A. Adams, 1855: synonym of Alinda H. Adams & A. Adams, 1855

References

Clausiliidae

fi:Hienouurresulkukotilo